Julian "Julo" Piotrowiak (born April 29, 1970), former bass guitarist of Pidżama Porno, where he played with his cousin, Rafal Piotrowiak. After breaking up of the band works as a bass guitar teacher in Poznań. Married.

External links 
 http://pidzamaporno.art.pl/?p=zespol
 http://pidzamaporno.art.pl/?p=new_view&id=235

1970 births
Living people
Polish musicians